Podocalyxin like 2 is a protein that in humans is encoded by the PODXL2 gene.

Structure

This gene is a member of the CD34 family of cell surface transmembrane proteins, which are characterized by an N-terminal extracellular mucin domain, globular and stalk domains, a single pass transmembrane region, and a charged cytoplasmic tail. The encoded protein is a ligand for vascular selectins. [provided by RefSeq, Oct 2012].

Function

Acts as a ligand for vascular selectins. Mediates rapid rolling of leukocytes over vascular surfaces through high affinity divalent cation-dependent interactions with E-, P- and L-selectins

References

Further reading